Joel Murphy (born September 30, 1974) — better known by his on-air personality Java Joel — is an American radio personality. He hosted a nightly weeknight radio program called The Rubber Room"on WKSC-FM 103.5 Kiss FM in Chicago, Illinois.  His show was also heard in other cities such as WKGS/Rochester NY, WAKS/Cleveland, WKST/Pittsburgh, KKRZ/Portland Kiss FM/Tulsa, and Kiss FM/Cincinnati.

The Rubber Room had 3 main members: Java Joel, the host; Jdogg, producer/sidekick; and Silly Jilly, female sidekick. Many other people stopped by the show including Chris Kelly, Alex, Camps, Joe V, and Joey T. In April 2003, The Rubber Room made national headlines after Java interviewed 
pop singer Justin Timberlake and angered him, which resulted in Timberlake telling Java to "take a valium bi*ch". Java has won numerous awards such as the Silver Dome Award and the Jock Conference Slammer Award. Chat
Java Joel was fired from WKSC on January 11, 2005 when at about 9:30PM he played the Mr. Belvedere theme song and made an inferred racial remark regarding African-Americans.  Since his firing, Java has appeared on stations in Philadelphia, Y-103.9 (Crystal Lake, IL) and 102.3 XLC (Waukegan, IL), WCKG (105.9FM) Chicago. Most recently, Java has been hired as a weekend fill-in at WKIE/WDEK/WRZA (92.7/92.5/99.9) "Nine FM" as well as afternoons on WYUL "94.7 Hits FM" in the Montreal market.  On August 4, 2006 Java Joel was hired as the night time DJ on WAKS/-96.5 KISS FM Cleveland, and in 2012 was moved to the afternoon drive slot.

In 2009, amid the Chris Brown assault allegations, he decided to pull all Chris Brown music off of his show, thus starting a station wide boycott of his music.

References

External links 
Joel's resume
 Radio Ink Magazine article
Billboard
Chat
 RadioNewsWeb
Google cache Chicago Sun article (includes arbitron ratings)
 Google cache of 106.7 KissFM
 Java Joel airchecks from multiple stations

Radio personalities from Chicago
1974 births
Living people